Boßler [], also written Bossler or Bosler in some family branches or testimonies of earlier centuries, is the name of a German family of merchants, entrepreneurs and industrialists, originally from southern Hesse, who were particularly active in the manufacture of air guns, in American cattle breeding and in passenger and freight shipping on the Neckar and Rhine. In addition, individual members of the family achieved importance in scientific or cultural terms over the course of time.

The unbroken line of the family dynasty, which has had a branch in Pennsylvania since 1738, a branch in France since 1791 and another branch in Neckarsteinach in the Bergstrasse district since 1822, has been documented in the area of the historic district of Lichtenberg (district Darmstadt-Dieburg) since 1616. Members of the dynasty appeared there as local lower and higher judicial court officials, as princely state officials in the forestry and cameral system of the Landgraviate of Hesse-Darmstadt and as burgraves belonging to the hesse court officials. Due to their social standing, they belonged to the regional notables.

History

The Origin of the Family 

The family tree begins in 1616 in the hessian Amt Lichtenberg. The family's ancestral home is Asbach, now a district of the municipality of Modautal. There the family survived the Thirty Years' War unharmed. Martin Boßler (1616–1694) is the progenitor of the family. He had four sons: Christian (1643–1690) burgrave and gunsmith, Matthaeus (1645–1716), Peter (1654–1697) and Johann Valentin (1661–1719).

cultural and social significance 
In the field of music and drama, the fine arts were shaped by two descendants of the South Hessian dynasty who were among the cultural elite of their time. The first was the renowned music publisher Heinrich Philipp Boßler (1744–1812), a figure who shaped music publishing in the 18th century. On the other hand, there was Friedrich Maximilian Klinger, a childhood friend of Goethe and one of the most important poets in literary history, whose work Sturm und Drang gave its name to an entire literary epoch in the Age of Enlightenment. Klinger found a connection to the Boßler family through his paternal grandmother's line. Both descend from the gunsmith Christian Boßler.

The baltic knighthoods itself points out that Klinger was married to an illegitimate daughter of the russian empress Catherine the Great. 

In addition, branches and twigs of the Boßler family share ancestors with important personalities from the fields of theology, science, politics and culture in earlier centuries or are closely intertwined with their family trees. These include, for example, the outstanding chemist Justus Liebig or Georg Gottfried Gervinus (1805–1871) as well as Friedrich Ludwig Weidig. At this point, the social-genealogical reference to the internationally known Merck family of Darmstadt also seems remarkable. In addition, there are recurring genealogical links to families of forestry and hunting officials or members of the Lutheran clergy.

The Paris branch, i.e. the French part of the family descended from Matthäus Boßler. The most famous scientific representative was the astronomer Jean Bosler (1878–1973),  whose work was shaped by his work as director at the Marseille Observatory. His scientific work was award-winning, even the Nobel Prize winner Erwin Schrödinger considered him for his work. Jean Boslers great-grandfather came from Reinheim and went to Paris. In France the surname Boßler was changed to the form Bosler.

In the natural sciences, the chemical element Darmstadtium, with atomic number 110 in the group 10 elements of the periodic table, is also associated with the name Bossler.

Entrepreneurship

Bosler brothers and cattle breeding on the Plains 
The Pennsylvania Dutch branch, i.e. the US-American part of the family, descends from Johann Wilhelm Boßler, the youngest son of Johann Valentin Boßler from Ernsthofen near Darmstadt.

Johann Wilhelm emigrated to Philadelphia on the Bilander Thistle from Rotterdam in 1738. His personal signature was Johann Wilhelm Boßler and he was married to a née Longenecker. His descendants included important cattle barons who are considered pioneers of cattle breeding and the cattle trade with reference to the Great Plains. In addition, members of the Bosler family were active as bankers, real estate entrepreneurs, philanthropists and patrons. With the cattle baron John Herman Bosler (1830-1897), a family member also belonged to the Electoral College for the Democrats. His brother James Williamson Bosler (1833-1883), himself a cattle baron, served as a member of the Iowa General Assembly, was a delegate to the Democratic National Convention in Charleston and subsequently acted for the Grand Old Party, of which he was a member of the Republican National Committee.

The Boslers from Carlisle, descended from the Pennsylvania Dutch branch, are also documented in literature under the surname Bossler. High-ranking politicians and statesmen belonged to the Social network of bankers and agro-industrialists Bosler.

The ghost town of Bosler in Wyoming was named after James Williamson Bosler.

Court gunsmith of the landgraves of Darmstadt 
Members of the dynasty and descendants of the gunsmith Christian Boßler made a name for themselves as hesse-darmstadt court gunsmiths. They created rifles that can still be found in public or private collections throughout Europe and have even found their way into the catalogues of Christie's, the global auction house. All in all, these family members have achieved a high social standing, are part of Hesse-Darmstadt's hunting history and have attained pioneer status through their famous creative art in the manufacture of air rifles.

The air rifles of the hesse-darmstadt court gunsmiths Johann Peter (1689–1742) and Friedrich Jacob Boßler (1717–1793) so famous that they were copied during the lifetime of their creators.

Inland shipping company in Neckarsteinach 
The Neckarsteinach branch, ergo the entire family from Neckarsteinach, is divided into an older and a younger family line and belongs to the history of shipping on the Neckar. The older line was active in cargo shipping on the Rhine and its tributaries. The Boßlers in Neckarsteinach are also descended from Matthaeus Boßler through the schoolmaster and merchant Johannes Boßler (1796–1834) from Nieder-Modau (near Ober-Ramstadt).   
 
The younger line concentrated on the business of passenger shipping (white shipping). It operated a passenger shipping company based in Bad Friedrichshall as well as two shipping companies in Neckarsteinach and Heidelberg. In the process, the family tradition of operating passenger transport on the Neckar since 1796 was advertised for tourist purposes. Members of the younger family line are considered pioneers of passenger shipping on the Neckar, as they were already active in this business field in the 1920s.

The guest list of the passenger companies run by the younger line included high personalities from the state and politics as well as furthermore foreign representatives. Descendants of the shipping entrepreneur Andreas Boßler (1884–1961) are today shareholders in the passenger shipping company Weisse Flotte Heidelberg. 

Thus a family branch of the younger line is involved in one of the largest tourism companies in the shipping industry in southern Germany.

Bibliography in German language 
 Johannes Feick: Lichtenberg im Odenwald in Vergangenheit und Gegenwart – nach den Quellen geschildert. Band 2. Kommissionsverlag Ludwig Saeng, Darmstadt 1903, p. 106.
 Europa-Verkehr = European transport = Transports européens. Band 18, Otto Elsner, Darmstadt 1970, p. 122–123.
 Helmut Betz: Historisches vom Strom Band. V –  Die Neckarschiffahrt vom Treidelkahn zum Groß-Motorschiff, Krüpfganz, Duisburg 1989, p. 53, 122, 128, 142–148.
 Günter Benja: Personenschiffahrt in deutschen Gewässern –  Vollständiges Verzeichnis aller Fahrgastschiffe und -dienste, mit 115 Schiffsfotos, Gerhard Stallinger Verlag, Oldenburg 1975, p. 34–35.
 Christie's: FINE ANTIQUE FIREARMS FROM THE W. KEITH NEAL COLLECTION. London 9. November 2000,, S. 160.
 Marcel Christian Boßler: Er war nicht zu Zella geboren! Der Hessen-Darmstädtische Hofbüchsenmacher Johann Peter Boßler und seine Dynastie, In: Waffen- und Kostümkunde - Zeitschrift für Waffen- und Kleidungsgeschichte, Sonnefeld 2020, p. 151–174, .
 Hans Schneider: Der Musikverleger Heinrich Philipp Bossler 1744–1812. Mit bibliographischen Übersichten und einem Anhang Mariane Kirchgeßner und Boßler, Tutzing 1985, . 
 Beethoven-Haus Bonn: Die musikalische Welt des jungen Beethoven. Beethovens Verleger Heinrich Philipp Boßler, Bonn 2001.

External links 

 freighter ships of the family Boßler in Vereniging de Binnenvaart (Dutch)
 the Boßler family in literature (German)
 The Boßler family in the Consortium of European Research Libraries
 Bosler family papers, 1864-1930 at the American Heritage Center of the University of Wyoming

Notes 

German families
People from Bergstraße (district)
History of Hesse
Firearm designers
German-language surnames
Businesspeople from Hesse
Carlisle, Pennsylvania
American cattlemen
Political families of the United States